List of events in the year 2012 in Honduras.

Incumbents 
 President - Porfirio Lobo
 Congress President - Juan Orlando Hernández
 Supreme Court President - Jorge Alberto Rivera Avilés

Events

February 14: Comayagua prison fire: A fire inside the prison of Comayagua kills 364 inmates, is noted as the deadliest prison fire in history.
 February 18: A massive fire destroys three markets in the center of Tegucigalpa, nine persons injured.
 March 7: The Supreme Electoral Court inscribes Partido Anticorrupción as new political party.
 March 29: A unrest and fire inside the San Pedro Sula kills 13 inmates.
 May 15: The radio journalist Alfredo Villatoro is found dead in Tegucigalpa after being kidnapped 6 days before by six unknown people.
 July 31: The wife of the Finance Minister Hector Guillén is arrested in Tegucigalpa with one million Lempiras (about $50.000).
 November 18: Primary elections, Juan Orlando Hernández wins the candidature for National Party of Honduras and Mauricio Villeda wins in the Liberal Party of Honduras.

References

External links

 
Honduras
Years of the 21st century in Honduras
Honduras
2010s in Honduras